The Five Ghosts is the fifth studio album by Stars, which was released worldwide on June 21, 2010, via Vagrant.  In Canada, the album was released via Soft Revolution, the band's own label.

The album was named as a longlisted nominee for the 2011 Polaris Music Prize.

Track listing

Those who pre-ordered the album received a bonus EP entitled The Séance, featuring songs from sessions for The Five Ghosts.  The Séance EP songs are also available as individual tracks through iTunes.

References

2010 albums
Stars (Canadian band) albums